Nasir Yusuf Gawuna (born 6 August 1967) is a Nigerian Health personnel, businessman and politician. In May 2022, he became the Governorship Candidate of All Progressive Congress for the 2023 Nigeria General Election. He is currently the Deputy Governor of Kano State serving under Governor Abdullahi Umar Ganduje He contested to be the Governor of Kano State in the 2023 Kano state governorship election under the party of All Progressive Congress.

Early life 
Nasir Yusuf was born on 6 August, 1967, in Kano city.

Political career
Nasir Yusuf Gawuna was appointed by Dr Abdullahi Umar Ganduje after the resignation of the former Deputy Governor Professor Hafiz Abubakar on 5 August 2018, Governor Ganduje also retained Gawuna as his running mate in the 2019 Nigerian general election. before his appointment Gawuna was the Commissioner Kano State, Ministry of Agriculture, since 2014 he was first appointed as a commissioner by former Governor of Kano State Engineer Rabiu Kwankwaso. 

Gawuna is the Chairman of Kano State Taskforce Committee on Covid-19 

He was chairman of Nassarawa Local Government Area for 8 years under the defunct All Nigeria Peoples Party ANPP while Ibrahim Shekarau was the Governor of Kano State he work with all the three Governors of the state.

Governorship
Gawuna in a statement by his Chief Press Secretary, Mr Hassan Musa Fagge, on 18 April 2022 resigned as the Commissioner of Agriculture and Natural Resources. in order for him to get the chance to join the race to Kano State Government House under the platform of All Progressive Congress (APC) 2022 Primary Election which is scheduled to hold on 18 May 2022 the incumbent Governor of Kano State Abdullahi Umar Ganduje Anointed Gawuna to be his Successor in 2023 Nigeria General Election, Governor Ganduje announce his decision at the stakeholders Meeting on Saturday 7 May 2022

See also
 Executive Council of Kano State

References 

1967 births
21st-century Nigerian politicians
Living people
Politicians from Kano
Politicians from Kano State
Businesspeople from Kano
People from Kano
Deputy Governors of Kano State
All Progressives Congress politicians
Nigerian Muslims